Doris Metaxa and Josane Sigart were the defending champions, but Metaxa did not compete. Sigart partnered with Peggy Scriven, but lost in the third round to Kitty Godfree and Peggy Michell.

Simonne Mathieu and Elizabeth Ryan defeated Freda James and Billie Yorke in the final, 6–2, 9–11, 6–4 to win the ladies' doubles tennis title at the 1933 Wimbledon Championships.

Seeds

  Simonne Mathieu /  Elizabeth Ryan (champions)
  Mary Heeley /  Dorothy Round (quarterfinals)
  Peggy Scriven /  Josane Sigart (third round)
  Eileen Fearnley-Whittingstall /  Betty Nuthall (quarterfinals)

Draw

Finals

Top half

Section 1

Section 2

Bottom half

Section 3

The nationality of PJE Cargill is unknown.

Section 4

The nationality of Mrs BV Bouch is unknown.

References

External links

Women's Doubles
Wimbledon Championship by year – Women's doubles
Wimbledon Championships - Doubles
Wimbledon Championships - Doubles